Santa Pola is a coastal town located in the comarca of Baix Vinalopó in the Valencian Community, Spain, by the Mediterranean Sea.

The town has an important salt evaporation pond known as the salines which remains in business, additionally, most of it is recognized as the Natural Park of Salines de Santa Pola, an important Ramsar site. The town was settled over the ruins of a Roman village called Portus Ilicitanus (literally, Harbour of Elche); after being abandoned for decades, then a castle was constructed in the 16th century which marked the repopulation of Santa Pola. The town has an archeological museum covering these phases.

Santa Pola is, at present, a coastal fishing and tourist town. Population more than doubles during the summer, with people coming mostly from the rest of the Alicante province, and also from the Basque autonomous community, Madrid, France and the UK, just to mention some. The nearby island of Tabarca (part of Alicante) can be visited by ship.

Next to it is the Carabasi area, a nature reserve. Gran Alacant lies only a few kilometres from Alicante Airport and a few hundred metres from the town of Los Arenales which is located in the Elche district.

In June 2009, the Valencian Government announced that the Alicante Tram system will be extended southwards via Alicante Airport and El Altet, to stations in Gran Alacant and Santa Pola and then onwards to Guardamar and Torrevieja before terminating in Murcia.

Etymology
The name is derived from Saint Paula, itself derived from Saint Paul the apostle, who arrived at Tabarca island, as tradition holds. However, it is likely that the name comes from Latin "palus", thence "pauls", finally "pol".

History
The first settlements in the area remount to the third millennium BC, proof of which have been tools and paintings from the Neolithic found in the Cueva de las Arañas del Carabassí, as well as remains found from hunter-gatherers of the Palaeolithic in the Cueva de las Teresitas.

During the fourth century BCE, a small walled settlement was built near Vanalopó river. It served mainly as a Greek-Iberia economical hub.
During the first century CE, near the former site a port was built, serving the city of Illici, named Portus Illicitanus (cited by Claudius Ptolemy in Geography).

This port proved paramount for the development of the region's maritime commerce, together with Cartagena's.
In 460 AC, emperor Majorians flotilla set sail to attack north African vandals, but was burnt at that same port.
From the Roman settlement a necropolis is still in place, as well as a fish-salting factory and the Roman House of Palmeral. Their remains are described as back as 1621 by Cristòfol Sanz, although they were excavated during the 20th century.

Economics
Economical activity in this region is based on agriculture, craft-making and fishing. 1.3% of the population was dedicated to agriculture in 2003, and that's only successful when coupled with artificial watering systems, needed for the 200 hectares of orange trees (102ha), mandarin trees (74ha), and pomegranate trees (18ha), together with 230ha used for vegetables such as melons, shallots, broccoli, etc.

Languages
According to article 35 of law n° 4/1983 (23 November), Santa Pola's official language is Valencian, together with Spanish (Spanish Constitution, article n°3, 1978). INE's latest census shows that 90% of the population speaks Valencian. There has been an increased positive trend in the influx of new language influences, in part due to immigration patterns in the region. This has caused suburbs such as Gran Alacant to have a significant population of English speakers.

Gallery

References

External links

 Santa Pola, in English.
 Santa Pola, City Overview with a Video and Pictures. From a local citizen. In English.
 Granalacant Urbanization, Granalacant Urbanization.
 Gran Alacant's Website | Devoted to Gran Alacant, http://www.mygranalacant.com

Municipalities in the Province of Alicante
Greek colonies in Iberia